Litherland High School is a secondary school in Litherland, Merseyside, England, headed by interim Principal Mr David Yates since 2019. The school was established in March 1948 as the first post-war school to be built in Lancashire, costing £116,000. The school made news headlines in 1981 with accusations of excessive corporal punishment, with reports of over 1,800 slipperings occurring over the preceding four terms up to February 1981.

Litherland High School was listed as a school requiring 'Special Measures' by a February 2014 Ofsted inspection. In March 2015 the school converted to academy status. It is part of the Litherland Partnership which includes local primary schools.

Over the 2022 summer holidays, the school merged buildings with Litherland Moss Primary School, with the renovations lasting months. The school has now moved in. (October 2022)

History

Construction
The school was the first post-war secondary to be built in what was then the county of Lancashire, at a cost of £116,000. The first foundation stone was laid by Sir James Aitken, chairman of Lancashire County Council and was planned to include a model flat, science laboratories and open-air teaching spaces. Originally scheduled to be open by December 1947 as a 450 intake girls-only secondary modern, the school was reported to include an assembly hall, dining room, kitchen and staff blocks, among 10 classrooms facing south-east. Special mention was given to the stage and lighting equipment, which was described as being capable of "staging plays by repertory companies".

Corporal punishment scandal
The school made news headlines in 1981 with accusations of excessive corporal punishment, with reports of over 1,800 slipperings occurring over the preceding four terms up to February 1981. Then Member of Parliament for Bootle, Allan Roberts, suggested that in the school, "violence, institutionalised in the way that it is, seems to be the norm rather than the exception". One teacher, Alan Corkish, made public the school's punishment book and was summonsed to a disciplinary hearing, which instigated rioting and protests by students. In a televised interview with the BBC's The Oxford Road Show, Alan Corkish explained his reasons for whistleblowing, stating that the school would use corporal punishment for trivial offenses "as the first resort, in almost every instance". Corkish suggested that many staff at the school were unaware of the rate of punishments at the school and suggested he knew only of four colleagues who opposed such punishments. Despite around 200 students staging a walkout in support of Corkish making the excessive punishments publicly known, he was subsequently sacked from his post several months later and his appeal to Sefton Council failed after a 5 hour meeting, following which he was reported to be considering taking his case to the High Court. Corkish appealed his dismissal and ultimately won his case at the Court of Appeal, with a ruling that Sefton Council "had followed the wrong procedures in dismissing Mr Alan Corkish". Corkish, who was being supported by the National Union of Teachers, was awarded his legal costs for appealing and said that he could not "wait to get back into teaching" and was open to the idea of returning to Litherland High School, although accepting that it was not "the best thing for everyone".

The headteacher, Mr Eric Colley, drew up plans in April 1981 to reinstate the cane in an attempt to reduce the amount of physical punishments. By July, four teachers had been suspended and the school, then referred to as the "slipper school" by the Liverpool Echo, was being promised a cash injection of £100,000 to help recover from the scandal. Education chiefs suggested that money would be spent on redecoration and modernisation to help give the school's image an "uplift" for the following academic year. It was reported that a new headteacher, Gerald Banks, would take over the 1,000-pupil school in October 1981 following its unfavourable record on corporal punishment.

Later history
In 1986, the school's sixth form was threatened with closure, to instead replaced by tertiary colleges at Hugh Baird College and Southport College respectively. The governors opposed the proposals and parents were hostile to the prospect of losing the sixth form, believing it would deprive children and their parents the choice of where they have their further education. Headmaster Gerald Banks accepted that falling rolls had meant that there were fewer students taking A-level courses, but appealed for more information about what Hugh Baird College could offer as an alternative. The council argued that projected pupil numbers heading into the 1990s meant that changes had to be made to deal with the "unacceptably small" numbers of students in Bootle, Litherland and Crosby sixth form centres.

The school was badly damaged in October 1997 when a fire, thought to have started in a woodwork workshop, was believed to have been started by arsonists. In February 2002, the school was awarded its specialist status as a 'Languages' college, with an assurance of £500,000 being spent over the following four years to enhance the language teaching facilities.

New school construction
The Liverpool Echo reported in October 2006 that Sefton Council had been awarded government funding to build a new school, which would merge with Bootle High School, mainly due to falling intake numbers particularly at Bootle High School, with proposals for a sixth form to be constructed on the Netherton site. Approval for the project was delayed due to an objection raised with regards to the closure of Bootle High School, although indications had been made that the DfES had approved Sefton's plan.

A meeting held at the Town Hall, Bootle in May 2007 indicated the project to cost approximately £22.4m, with the new higher capacity Litherland High School to take effect from 1 September 2009. All pupils at Bootle High School were guaranteed a place at the new Litherland High School.

As of 1 September 2009, over 400 new students started at the school. Most were transferred over from the now closed Bootle High School and the rest were the new year-7 pupils. Up to now the merge has been a great success in the views of both old Bootle High School children and Litherland High School children. Children from current 8 to 10 were merged in forms and classes while current year-11s were just mixed for forms and kept separate for lessons. This decision was authorized to try not to place the pupils' education at greater risk by them having to make new friends while trying to concentrate on their GCSEs. The school was recognised as the most improved in the borough when a report in January 2010 noted the percentage of students achieving five GCSEs inclusive of English and Maths increasing from 23% to 44%.

References

Secondary schools in the Metropolitan Borough of Sefton
Academies in the Metropolitan Borough of Sefton